Denticucullus is a genus of moths of the family Noctuidae.

Species
 Denticucullus mabillei (D. Lucas, 1907)
 Denticucullus pygmina – Small Wainscot (Haworth, 1809)

References

Xyleninae